Lieutenant Colonel Abraham Boulger VC (4 September 1835, in Kilcullen, County Kildare – 23 January 1900) was an Irish recipient of the Victoria Cross, the highest and most prestigious award for gallantry in the face of the enemy that can be awarded to British and Commonwealth forces.

In 1857 Boulger was serving with the 84th Regiment of Foot (later 2nd Bn, The York and Lancaster Regiment), during the Indian Mutiny and was involved in the Siege of Cawnpore and the Relief of Lucknow. He was a 21 year old Lance-Corporal when he was awarded the VC for the following service:
Lance-Corporal Abraham BoulgerDate of Acts of Bravery, from 12th July to 25th September, 1857For distinguished bravery and forwardness; a skirmisher, in all the twelve actions fought between 12th July, and 25th September, 1857. (Extract from Field Force Orders of the late Major-General Havelock, dated 17 October 1857.)

Boulger became sergeant major of the 84th Foot, and in November 1872 was commissioned as the Regiment's Quartermaster. He served in the 1882 Anglo-Egyptian War with his regiment, now titled the York and Lancaster Regiment. While remaining quartermaster, he was promoted to honorary captain in November, 1882, and honorary Major in March 1883, 'in recognition of his services during the recent campaign in Egypt'. He retired with the honorary rank of Lieutenant-Colonel in November 1887.

Boulger died in Moate, County Westmeath, Ireland, on 23 January 1900, aged 64. His Victoria Cross is displayed at the York & Lancaster Regiment Museum in Rotherham, England.

References

Listed in order of publication
The Register of the Victoria Cross (1981, 1988 and 1997)

Ireland's VCs (Dept of Economic Development, 1995)
Monuments to Courage (David Harvey, 1999)
Irish Winners of the Victoria Cross (Richard Doherty & David Truesdale, 2000)

External links
Location of grave and VC medal (County Kildare, Ireland)

1835 births
1900 deaths
Irish recipients of the Victoria Cross
Indian Rebellion of 1857 recipients of the Victoria Cross
York and Lancaster Regiment soldiers
People from County Kildare
Irish officers in the British Army
19th-century Irish people
York and Lancaster Regiment officers
British Army personnel of the Anglo-Egyptian War
84th Regiment of Foot officers
British Army recipients of the Victoria Cross
People from Moate
Military personnel from County Kildare
Burials in County Westmeath